Mynard may refer to:

 Les Mynard (1925–2008), English footballer 
 Mynard, Nebraska, unincorporated community
 Mynard Road Bridge, in Nebraska